Psycho-Man is a supervillain appearing in American comic books published by Marvel Comics.

Publication history

Psycho-Man first appeared in Fantastic Four Annual #5 (Nov. 1967) and was created by Stan Lee and Jack Kirby.

Fictional character biography
Psycho-Man first appears in the 1967 Fantastic Four annual, as the leader of a technocracy that governs a microscopic system of worlds in the Microverse. Due to overpopulation on these worlds, the character decides that the macroscopic world will be an ideal new base. Using technology from the mainstream Marvel universe, Psycho-Man remains microscopic in size but is able to function by controlling a suit of advanced human-sized armor. Using a portable device capable of influencing people's emotions, Psycho-Man enslaves a number of human subjects to build a larger version of the machine, with the intent of subjugating the world. The plan, however, is thwarted by Fantastic Four members the Human Torch and the Thing, by the Royal Family of the Inhumans and by the Black Panther; Psycho-Man is forced to retreat back to the Microverse.

The character reappears in the title Fantastic Four when Mister Fantastic, the Human Torch and the Thing travel to Psycho-Man's realm to find the Herald of Galactus, the Silver Surfer. Becoming aware of the threat of Galactus, Psycho-Man allows the heroes and the Surfer to leave unopposed. In the title Micronauts the diminutive heroes are joined by the entire Fantastic Four and battle Psycho-Man, who at this time claims to be in forced exile. Psycho-Man reappears in the title Fantastic Four and uses an android based on the villain the Hate-Monger to incite hatred amongst the population of New York City. Psycho-Man succeeds in transforming the Invisible Woman into the entity Malice and sends her to destroy the remainder of the Fantastic Four. Mister Fantastic frees his wife from the conditioning and they pursue Psycho-Man to the Microverse, where the villain is forced to experience a number of negative emotions simultaneously by the Invisible Girl after she turned his own equipment against him. The villain lapses into a coma and Susan Richards, in recognition of the personal growth she experienced during this mission, changes her name to the Invisible Woman.

Reduced to a minuscule size after an accidental exposure to Ant-Man's shrinking gas, Spider-Man finds himself in the Microverse face-to-face with Psycho-Man. After a failed attempt to drain the Captain Universe power from Spider-Man (a power he no longer possesses), Spider-Man escapes from Psycho-Man's prison to find an alien universe that Psycho-Man has shrunk and demanded they make him king. After a battle with Psycho-Man, Spider-Man, with the help of the beings of this shrunken universe, is able to destroy the device that controls Psycho-Man's power to manipulate the sizes of things, causing Psycho-Man to shrink and Spider-Man to return to normal size.

In the fourth volume of the title Captain Marvel, the Kree hero Genis-Vell has an encounter with Psycho-Man in the Microverse when the villain temporarily controls Marvel's ally, Drax the Destroyer. The character launches another attack on New York City in the title Marvel Knights 4 but is defeated once again by the Invisible Woman; appears in an issue of the fourth volume of the Black Panther and battles a new version of the Fantastic Four (the Black Panther; the mutant Storm;  the Thing and the Human Torch).

Psycho-Man is killed by the Red Hulk during a tournament organized by the Grandmaster, but restored to life with other fallen characters when the tournament is completed.

It is revealed that Psycho-Man has a daughter, who calls herself Psycho-Woman, who uses an "emotional modifier" device, far superior to her father's technology. She engineered a series of events that led to Johnny Storm impregnating a woman, in hopes of using the child's genetics to create a cosmic energy-powered army. Hiding in Johnny's body, she was apparently incinerated when he "flamed on".

Psycho-Man attempted to take control of the students of Avengers Academy while they were out on a 'field trip' with substitute teacher Spider-Man. He was defeated when Spider-Man's will power proved sufficient to shake off his influence thanks to his old experience with the Psycho-Man. Spider-Man rallied the other students to fight back and throw off his control, simultaneously giving Spider-Man the chance to connect to his students and prompt them to prove their worth as heroes.

During the "Fear Itself" storyline, Psycho-Man takes advantage of the fear and chaos caused by the Serpent and his Worthy by plotting to use Man-Thing as the ultimate fear bomb for Earth and other worlds. Psycho-Man has to deal with the Fearsome Four (consisting of Howard the Duck, She-Hulk, Nighthawk, and Frankenstein's Monster). Psycho-Man brings forth an alternate version of the Fantastic Four (consisting of Spider-Man, Wolverine, Gray Hulk, and Ghost Rider) from another dimension and brainwashes them into fighting the Fearsome Four. Howard the Duck uses his secret weapon - a device called the "No Thing" - which defeats Psycho-Man and the alternate Fantastic Four.

When the mysterious Quiet Man mounted an attack on the FF, one of the villains he recruited to aid in his assault was the Psycho-Man, whose dimensional technology helped the Quiet Man access the forces of Counter-Earth created by Franklin Richards, recruiting and brainwashing its heroes as part of his plans. However, the Psycho-Man's role in his plan also allowed Reed to defeat the Quiet Man, whose plan depended on the idea that the villains would withdraw and allow the Quiet Man to present himself as the hero who exposed Reed's attack, as Reed correctly deduced that the Psycho-Man wouldn't give up control over two worlds. The Psycho-Man was defeated when Valeria managed to calculate how to hack his equipment and use it to make the Quiet Man's forces withdraw.

During the aftermath of the "Secret Empire" storyline, Psycho-Man then appears in Colorado causing a riot until he is thwarted by the Champions. Before escaping, Psycho-Man's emotion-controlling device affects the time-displaced Cyclops which causes him to behave strangely. He then appears in a facility in Alabama, where he affects the scientists with his device and uses them to attack the Champions until Cyclops defeats him by attacking him from behind, nearly killing him.

Powers and abilities
Psycho-Man possesses advanced intelligence and, in experimental and combat situations, uses a portable emotion-controlling device called the "Control-Box" that projects a ray capable of stimulating the centers of emotion within a person's brain. The device has settings allowing it to trigger fear, doubt and hate at varying degrees of intensity. Being a microscopic being, Psycho-Man uses and remotely controls an advanced body armor (with varying abilities) when appearing on Earth. The character also possesses a space vessel for transport.

Other versions

Ultimate Marvel 
Psycho-Man appears in Ultimate Fantastic Four #44 (Sept 2007). He is the ruler of Zenn-La, and is called Revka Temerlune Edifex Scyros III, "The king with no enemies". The Silver Surfer is his herald, having been trained as his successor. The name "Psycho-Man" is given to him by Johnny Storm. Revka uses his mind control powers to make the people of Manhattan worship him, claiming he will bring peace to the world. He then takes them to Zenn-La, to "see what Heaven is like". He erases the memories of all the people and gives them the lives of dead Zenn-la dwellers. He once ruled old Zenn-La and lost his sanity. After he trained Norrin Radd to be his successor Norrin broke Revka's control of people and Zenn-La destroyed itself. When the Fantastic Four regain their memories and powers he sends out a band of Silver Surfer-like assassins. In the battle's aftermath, Psycho-Man lost control of the people and was "reprogrammed." Revka possesses strong telepathic powers which are further augmented by surgical implants, which also grant him near immortality.

Deadpool Kills the Marvel Universe
In the limited series Deadpool Kills the Marvel Universe, the X-Men send Deadpool to a mental hospital for therapy. However, the doctor treating him is actually Psycho-Man in disguise, who attempts to torture and brainwash Deadpool into becoming his personal minion, seeking to create an army of supervillains under his control. The procedure fails, but leaves Deadpool mentally unhinged; as a result, he kills Psycho-Man by repeatedly smashing him against a desk and begins assassinating every superhero and supervillain on Earth one by one.

In other media

Television
 Psycho-Man appears in the Fantastic Four episode "Worlds Within Worlds" voiced by Jamie Horton.

References

External links
 Psycho-Man at Marvel.com

Characters created by Jack Kirby
Characters created by Stan Lee
Comics characters introduced in 1967
Marvel Comics supervillains